Mahadev may refer to:

Shiva, a primary Hindu deity
Parashiva, a form of Shiva
Parameshwara (god), a form of Shiva
Mahadev, Nepal
Mahadev Peak, a mountain peak in Kashmir Valley
Kailashnath Mahadev Statue in Nepal
Para Brahman, a Hindu deity

People
Mahadev Desai (1892–1942), Indian independence activist
Mahadev Govind Ranade (1842–1901), Indian scholar and social reformer

See also
 Devon Ke Dev...Mahadev, an Indian TV series which ran 2011-2014
 Mahadeva (disambiguation)